The  was one of the first classes of submarine in the Imperial Japanese Navy (IJN) to serve during the Second World War. Type-C submarines were better armed than the Type-A and Type-B. The Type-Cs were also utilized as Kō-hyōteki or Kaiten mother ships, for this reason they were not equipped with aviation facilities.

Class variants
The Type-C submarines were divided into three classes:
 
 
 . However, the Vessel number 379-class was never built.

Type-C (I-16 class)

Project number S38 and S38B (Latter batch). They were based on the I-7 class. Eight boats were built between 1937 and 1944 under the Maru 3 Programme (Boats  44 - 48) and the Maru Kyū Programme (Boats  376 - 378).

Boats in class

Type-C Mod. (I-52 class)

Project number S37D. Twenty boats were planned under the Maru Tsui Programme (Boats 625 - 632) and the Kai-Maru 5 Programme (Boats 5141 - 5155). According to their Project number, they were one of the variants of the Type-B submarine.

Boats in class
{| class="wikitable"
| width="4%" | Boat No.
| width="3%" | Boat
| width="10%" | Builder
| width="5%" | Laid down
| width="5%" | Launched
| width="5%" | Completed
| width="25%" | Results
| width="20%" | Fate
|-
| 625
| 
| Kure Naval Arsenal
| 18-03-1942
| 10-11-1942
| 28-12-1943
| 
|-
| 626
| 
| Kure Naval Arsenal
| 15-05-1942
| 24-12-1942
| 20-02-1944
| Damaged  21-07-1945 by Kaiten.Sank  on 24-07-1945 by Kaiten.Damaged  on 04-08-1945 by Kaiten.
| Converted to a Kaiten mother ship in July 1944. Decommissioned on 30-11-1945, sunk as a target off the Gotō Islands on 01-04-1946.
|-
| 628
| 
| Kure Naval Arsenal
| 15-06-1942
| 20-04-1943
| 20-04-1944
| 
|-
| 630632
| I-57I-59
| 
| 
| 
| 
| 
| rowspan="2"|Cancelled in 1943.
|-
| 5141 - 5155
| 
| 
| 
| 
| 
| 
|-
|}

Type V22B
Project number S49B'''. Twenty eight boats were planned under the Maru Kyū Programme (Boats 379 - 381) and the Kai-Maru 5 Programme (Boats 5156 - 5180).

Boats in class

Characteristics

Footnotes

Bibliography, History of Pacific War Vol.17 I-Gō Submarines, Gakken (Japan), January 1998, Rekishi Gunzō, History of Pacific War Vol.35 Kō-hyōteki and Kōryū, Gakken (Japan), April 2002, Rekishi Gunzō, History of Pacific War Vol.36 Kairyū and Kaiten, Gakken (Japan), May 2002, Rekishi Gunzō, History of Pacific War Extra, "Perfect guide, The submarines of the Imperial Japanese Forces", Gakken (Japan), March 2005, Model Art Extra No.537, Drawings of Imperial Japanese Naval Vessels Part-3, Model Art Co. Ltd. (Japan), May 1999, Book code 08734-5The Maru Special, Japanese Naval Vessels No.31 Japanese Submarines I'', Ushio Shobō (Japan), September 1979, Book code 68343-31

See also
Cruiser submarine

Submarine classes
 
Submarines of the Imperial Japanese Navy